Mike Hauptmeijer (born 18 March 1997) is a Dutch professional footballer who plays as a goalkeeper for Eerste Divisie club PEC Zwolle.

Professional career
Hauptmeijer joined the PEC Zwolle youth academy at the age of 9, and trained exclusively with their youth academy. He made his professional debut for Zwolle on 3 February 2018 in a 4–0 Eredivisie loss to PSV Eindhoven, as a late substitute after Mickey van der Hart got a red-card in the 42nd minute.

On 31 January 2019, Hauptmeijer was loaned out to Achilles '29.

International career
Hauptmeijer has been place on standby for the Netherlands U15s and Netherlands U20s, but hasn't made a formal debut at any level.

References

External links
 
 
 
 Eredivisie Profile
 Sport.de Profile

1997 births
Living people
People from Dalfsen
Association football goalkeepers
Dutch footballers
PEC Zwolle players
Achilles '29 players
Eredivisie players
Eerste Divisie players
Derde Divisie players
Footballers from Overijssel